Punta Lara is a city located in the Ensenada Partido, in Buenos Aires Province, Argentina.

References 

Populated places in Buenos Aires Province